The first season of America's Best Dance Crew premiered on February 7, 2008. The season, hosted by Mario Lopez, featured a judging panel consisting of Lil Mama, JC Chasez, and Shane Sparks. In the live finale, which aired on March 27, 2008, JabbaWockeeZ was declared the winner.

Cast
For the first season of America's Best Dance Crew, the competitors auditioned in four cities: New York City, Atlanta, Chicago, and Los Angeles. A total of twelve dance crews were selected from the four cities and then categorized into four regions: Midwest, South, East Coast, and West Coast. Following the live casting special on January 26, 2008, the initial pool of dance crews was narrowed down to nine.

Results

: The live auditions special determined the nine spots for the season premiere.
Key
 (WINNER) The dance crew won the competition and was crowned "America's Best Dance Crew".
 (RUNNER-UP) The dance crew was the runner-up in the competition.
 (IN) The dance crew was safe from elimination.
 (RISK) The dance crew was at risk for elimination.
 (OUT) The dance crew was eliminated from the competition.

Episodes

Episode 0: The Search Begins
Original Airdate: January 26, 2008 
Twelve dance crews competed in a live casting special for America's Best Dance Crew.

Episode 1: The Battle Begins
Original Airdate: February 7, 2008 
Each crew performed to a mix of their favorite dance track. The crews were broken up into groups of three. The judges selected one crew from each group (italicized) to be safe from elimination and move on to the next week. Afterwards, the judges picked the bottom two crews to compete in a sudden death dance-off to guest performer Flo Rida's song "Low".

Safe: Live in Color, Status Quo, Kaba Modern, JabbaWockeeZ, Breaksk8, Fysh n Chicks, Femme 5
Bottom 2: Enigma Dance Kru, ICONic
Eliminated: Enigma Dance Kru

Episode 2: Music Video Moves
Original Airdate: February 14, 2008
Each crew was given a different music video containing a dance sequence, which they had to perform while maintaining their own style.

Safe: Kaba Modern, Live in Color, JabbaWockeeZ, Breaksk8, ICONic, Status Quo
Bottom 2: Fysh n Chicks, Femme 5
Eliminated: Femme 5

Episode 3: Dance Craze Challenge
Original Airdate: February 21, 2008
Each crew performed a popular dance, also known as a "dance craze", while preserving their own style. Since some of the dance crazes were very simple to execute, each team had to complete an additional challenge while performing.

Safe: Live in Color, JabbaWockeeZ, Breaksk8, Kaba Modern, Fysh n Chicks
Bottom 2: Status Quo, ICONic
Eliminated: ICONic

Episode 4: Movie Characters
Original Airdate: February 28, 2008
The crews portrayed movie characters through dance.

Safe: JabbaWockeeZ, Kaba Modern, Status Quo, Breaksk8
Bottom 2: Fysh n Chicks, Live in Color
Eliminated: Live in Color

Episode 5: Thriller
Original Airdate: March 6, 2008
Each crew performed to a track from Michael Jackson's Thriller album, in honor of its 25th anniversary, and incorporated Jackson's signature moves into their routine.

Safe: Status Quo, JabbaWockeeZ, Kaba Modern
Bottom 2: Fysh n Chicks, Breaksk8
Eliminated: Fysh n Chicks

Episode 6: Broadway Remixed
Original Airdate: March 13, 2008
At the beginning of the show, the crews teamed up to perform a routine to a hip hop remix of Annie's "It's the Hard Knock Life". Then, each crew had to transform a traditional Broadway number into a hip hop routine.

Safe: Status Quo, JabbaWockeeZ
Bottom 2: Kaba Modern, Breaksk8
Eliminated: Breaksk8

Episode 7: Evolution of Street Dance
Original Airdate: March 20, 2008
All three crews performed to a same remix highlighting the evolution of street dancing over the past 30 years.

Safe: Status Quo
Bottom 2: JabbaWockeeZ, Kaba Modern
Eliminated:  Kaba Modern
The two finalists compete in an encore "do or die" round.

Episode 8: The Live Finale
Original Airdate: March 27, 2008
The eliminated crews returned and performed with the finalists for a regional collaboration. Instead of going head-to-head, JabbaWockeeZ and Status Quo teamed up for their last performance.

Winner: JabbaWockeeZ
Runner-up: Status Quo

References

External links 
 

2008 American television seasons
America's Best Dance Crew